ISPA may refer to:

 Indian Space Association (ISpA)
 Institute of Space and Planetary Astrophysics
 Instrument for Structural Policies for Pre-Accession, part of the European Union Regional policy
 International Sleep Products Association
 Internet Service Providers Association (disambiguation)
 Internet Service Providers Association (United Kingdom)
 Internet Service Providers Association (South Africa)
 Iranian Students Polling Agency
Immunization of School Pupils Act, vaccination law in Ontario, Canada